The Ironton Rail Trail is a rail trail that spans  in Lehigh County, Pennsylvania. The trail was made from tracks of the defunct Ironton Railroad and includes a paved  loop. 

The trail spreads across Whitehall Township, Coplay and North Whitehall. It is a very popular trail in the Lehigh Valley for walkers, bikers, runners and dog walkers. The trail has many events such as a 10k race held every year.

References

External links
 

Rail trails in Pennsylvania
Protected areas of Lehigh County, Pennsylvania